The Queen and the Dreams is the first studio album of Chinese singer Li Yuchun, released on September 15, 2006, by Taihe Rye.

Track listing

Music videos
Loving
Happy Wake Up
Raining
Ice Chrysanthemum Story

References

2006 albums
Li Yuchun albums
Chinese-language albums